Julia Aleksandrovna Vysotskaya (born 16 August 1973) is a Russian actress and television presenter.

Biography 
Julia Vysotskaya was born in Novocherkassk, Rostov Oblast, Russian SFSR, Soviet Union (now Russia). She finished high school № 9 in the city of Baku in 1990. She graduated in drama from the Belarusian State Academy of Arts in 1995 and the London Academy of Music and Dramatic Art in 1998.

She worked at the Belarusian Janka Kupała National Academic Theatre, where she played the lead role in productions of The Star Without a Name and The Bald Soprano among others.

She has acted in productions staged at the Mossovet Academy Theatre.

Since 2003 she has presented the evening programme Let's Eat at Home! and the morning show Breakfast with Julia Vysotskaya on NTV.

In 2008 she was invited to be the culinary supervisor at a Russian evening held during the World Economic Forum in London. In 2009 she was culinary director of the Moscow restaurant "Family Floor".

She has been the editor-in-chief of the culinary magazine KhlebSol since 2009, year in which she also helped set up the www.edimdoma.ru culinary social network and the first online cooking channel www.edimdoma.tv where users can watch Julia Vysotskaya preparing dishes, and her video blog, which is regularly updated with new content.

Vysotskaya is the author of numerous cookery best-sellers, of which she has already sold over one and half million copies.

The actress has received wide acclaim for her portrayal of Olga in the 2016 Holocaust drama Paradise.

Personal life 
She has been married to film director Andrei Konchalovsky since 1998. They have two children, a daughter, Maria (1999), and a son, Petr (2003).

Recognitions and awards 
 Best Actress Award for her role in John Osbourne's play Look Back in Anger
 Best Actress Award at the "Vivat, kino Rossii" festival for her role in House of Fools
 In 2007, her programme Let's Eat at Home! received the prestigious "TEFI" award in the Entertainment Programme. Way of Life category, and an "Effie" award for Brand of the Year.
 In 2009, the programme Let's Eat at Home! was awarded the "Approved by Russian Ecologist" accolade in recognition of its work promoting a healthy lifestyle.
Best Actress Award at the Golden Eagle Awards for her role in Paradise
Best Actress Award at the Nika Awards for her role in Paradise
Best Actress Award at the Munich International Film festival for her role in Paradise

Work in the theatre

Yanka Kupala National Academic Theatre 
 1993: The Bald Soprano by E. Ionesco — Mrs. Smith
 1995: Look Back in Anger by J. Osborne — Alison
 1995: The Star Without a Name by M. Sebastian — Mona
 2002: Love Is a Golden Book, play inspired by A. Tolstoy's work

Mossovet Theatre 
 2004: The Seagull by A. Chekhov — Nina Zarechnaya
 2009–present day: Uncle Vanya by A. Chekhov — Sonya

Moscow Dramatic Theatre on Malaya Bronnaya 
 2005 and 2009: Miss Julie by A. Strindberg — Miss Julie

Filmography

Bibliography 
 2006 — "Let's Eat at Home. Recipes by Julia Vysotskaya"
 2007 — "Let's Eat at Home all Year Round"
 2007 — "Gloss"
 2008 — "Let's Eat at Home Every Day"
 2008 — "Tasty Notes"
 2009 — "I Eat, I Run, I Live"
 2010 — "Cooking for Kids of All Ages"
 2010 — "New Year Recipes"
 2011 — "One, Two and Ready"

References

External links 

 The shows "Let's Eat at Home" and "Breakfast with Julia Vysotskaya" on NTV
 Julia Vysotskaya's "Let's Eat at Home" website
 Julia Vysotskaya's edimdoma.tv culinary television channel
 Website of Julia Vysotskaya's "KhlebSol" culinary magazine
 Film search engine
 

1973 births
Living people
People from Novocherkassk
Russian film actresses
Russian stage actresses
Russian television presenters
Russian chefs
20th-century Russian actresses
21st-century Russian actresses
Russian expatriates in Belarus
Belarusian film actresses
Belarusian stage actresses
Alumni of the London Academy of Music and Dramatic Art
Russian food writers
Belarusian State Academy of Arts alumni
Russian women television presenters
Belarusian women television presenters
Recipients of the Nika Award
Russian restaurateurs
Mikhalkov family